The 2013–14 Utah Valley Wolverines men's basketball team represented Utah Valley University in the 2013–14 NCAA Division I men's basketball season. Dick Hunsaker entered his twelfth season as the UVU head coach. The Wolverines played their home games at the UCCU Center as new members of the Western Athletic Conference. They finished the season 20–12, 13–3 in WAC play to win the WAC regular season championship. They advanced to the semifinals of the WAC tournament where they lost to Idaho. As a regular season conference champion who failed to win their conference tournament, they received an automatic bid to the National Invitation Tournament where they lost in the first round to California.

Roster

Radio broadcasts and streams
All Wolverines games will air on KOVO, part of The Zone family of networks. Games will be streamed online through The Zone's webpage as well as at Utah Valley's Stretch Internet feed.

Schedule and results

The Wolverines participated in a China Trip during the month of August for their exhibition season. The Wolverines trip took 15 days and had 9 games. Included in the matches were Chinese Basketball Association Teams in Hangzhou, Shaoxing, Jinhua, Wenzhou, and Shenzhen. The exhibition trip was managed by World Vision Sports Management.

|-
!colspan=9 style="background:#006633; color:#CFB53B;"| Regular season

|-
!colspan=9 style="background:#006633; color:#CFB53B;"| 2014 WAC tournament

|-
!colspan=9 style="background:#006633; color:#CFB53B;"| NIT

References

Utah Valley Wolverines men's basketball seasons
Utah Valley
Utah Valley